The Battle of Old Byland (also known as the Battle of Byland Abbey, the Battle of Byland Moor and the Battle of Scotch Corner) was a significant encounter between Scots and English troops in Yorkshire in October 1322, forming part of the Wars of Scottish Independence.  It was a victory for the Scots, the most significant since Bannockburn.

Raids and revenge
Ever since Robert Bruce's victory at the Battle of Bannockburn in 1314, the Scots had taken the initiative in the wars with England, raiding deep into the north of the country repeatedly and with comparative ease to attempt to force the English to the peace-table.  The English king, Edward II seemed incapable of dealing with the problem, distracted, as he often was, in a political struggle with his own barons and refused to even begin peace negotiations with the Scots which would have required recognizing Robert the Bruce as King of the Scots.  In early 1322 the situation had become critical, with some senior English noblemen, headed by Thomas of Lancaster, preparing to enter into an alliance with the Scots.

It seems unlikely that Bruce had much confidence in Lancaster, who referred to himself as 'King Arthur' in his negotiations with the Scots, but he was quick to take advantage of the threat of civil war in England.  Scarcely had the truce of 1319 expired in January 1322 than Sir James Douglas, Thomas Randolph, 1st Earl of Moray and Walter Stewart came over the border on a large-scale attack on the north-east.  The three commanders fanned out across the region: Douglas to Hartlepool, Moray to Darlington and Stewart to Richmond.  Lancaster with his army at Pontefract did nothing to stop them.  Edward ignored the Scots, instructing his lieutenant in the north, Sir Andrew Harclay, the governor of Carlisle, to concentrate his efforts against the rebel barons, whom he finally defeated at the Battle of Boroughbridge.  In the wake of this the Scots raiders slipped back across the border.

Edward's invasion
Boroughbridge was a new beginning for Edward.  The baronial opposition had been defeated and tainted with treason: the king had at last enjoyed his long-awaited revenge for the murder of Piers Gaveston.  This was the high point of his reign and, emboldened by this rare triumph, he decided to embark on what was to be his last invasion of Scotland.  It was to be a disaster.

By the time Edward was ready to begin his advance in early August Bruce was more than ready.  He deployed his usual tactics: crops were destroyed and livestock removed and his army withdrawn north of the River Forth.  In all of Lothian the English are said only to have found one lame cow, causing the Earl of Surrey to remark; This is the dearest beef I ever saw. It surely has cost a thousand pounds and more! In the Scalacronica, Sir Thomas Grey describes the whole campaign thus;

The king marched upon Edinburgh, where at Leith there came such a sickness and famine upon the common soldiers of that great army, that they were forced to beat a retreat for want of food; at which time the king's light horse were defeated by James de Douglas.  None dared leave the main body to seek food by forage, so greatly were the English harassed and worn out by fighting that before they arrived in Newcastle there was such a murrain in the army for want of food, that they were obliged of necessity to disband.

Holyrood Abbey in Edinburgh, and the border abbeys of Melrose and Dryburgh were destroyed in revenge by the English. The invasion had achieved precisely nothing.  More seriously, the effect on national morale of the ignominious retreat of a starving army was almost as bad as the defeat at Bannockburn.  Worse was to follow; for, as always, an English retreat was the signal for yet another Scottish attack.

Old Byland
Bruce crossed the Solway in the west, making his way in a south-easterly direction towards Yorkshire, bringing many troops recruited in Argyll and the Isles.  The boldness and speed of the attack, known as The Great Raid of 1322, soon exposed Edward to the dangers on his own land.  On his return from Scotland, the king had taken up residence at Rievaulx Abbey with Queen Isabella.  His peace was interrupted when the Scots made a sudden and unexpected approach in mid-October.  All that stood between them and a royal prize was a large English force under the command of John of Brittany, Earl of Richmond.  John had taken up position on Scawton Moor, between Rievaulx and Byland Abbey.  To dislodge him from his strong position on the high ground Bruce used the same tactics that brought victory at the earlier Battle of Pass of Brander.  As Moray and Douglas charged uphill a party of Highlanders scaled the cliffs on the English flank and charged downhill into Richmond's rear.  Resistance crumbled and the Battle of Old Byland turned into a complete and bloody rout of the English.  Richmond himself was taken prisoner, as were Henri de Sully, Grand Butler of France, Sir Ralph Cobham ('the best knight in England') and Sir Thomas Ughtred.  Many others were killed in flight.  Edward – 'ever chicken-hearted and luckless in war' – was forced to make a rapid and undignified exit from Rievaulx, fleeing in such haste that his personal belongings were left behind.  After Byland, says Sir Thomas Gray, the Scots were so fierce and their chiefs so daring, and the English so cowed, that it was no otherwise between them than as a hare before greyhounds. This was a significant victory for the Scots after their success at Myton on Swale and was soon followed 5 years later by their victory at Stanhope Park over Edward III.

Notes

References
Primary
 Barbour, John, The Bruce, trans. A. A. H. Douglas, 1964.
 Gray, Sir Thomas, Scalicronica, trans. H. Maxwell, 1913.
 The Lanercost Chronicle, trans. H. Maxwell, 1913.
 Giovanni Villani Nuova Cronica. Book X, Chapter CLXXX.

Secondary
 Barrow, G. W. S. Robert Bruce and the Community of the Realm of Scotland, 1964.
 Barron, E. M. The Scottish War of Independence, 1934.
 Scammel, J., Robert I and the North of England, in The English Historical Review'', vol. 73, 1958.

Old Byland
Old Byland 1322
1322 in England
1322 in Scotland
Conflicts in 1322
Military history of North Yorkshire